A Man There Was is a 1917 Swedish drama directed by Victor Sjöström, based on a poem of the same title by Henrik Ibsen. With a budget of SEK 60,000, it was the most expensive Swedish film made up to that point, marking a new direction in Swedish cinema with more funding to fewer films, resulting in more total quality.

This film is considered to be the start of the golden age of Swedish silent film that would end after Gösta Berlings saga in 1925, although films such as Ingeborg Holm (1913) are often assigned to this era as well.

Plot
Terje Vigen lives happily with his wife and little girl on a small island in Norway. In 1809 during the Napoleonic Wars, the town is starving due to the British blockade. Terje decides to row to Denmark to bring food to his family. On the way back, he is captured by a ruthless English captain and sent to jail in England. When the war ends and he is finally freed, Terje finds that his wife and daughter have died. He takes up a solitary life in his house overlooking the sea. One night he sees a British yacht in distress in a storm. He rushes to her help and discovers that the skipper is the same man that had taken him prisoner and destroyed his life many years before. He decides against vengeance and rescues the skipper along with the skipper's wife and child.

Cast
 Victor Sjöström as Terje Vigen
 Edith Erastoff as The Lady
 August Falck as The Lord
 Bergliot Husberg as Mrs. Vigen

Production
In Grimstad, Norway, while working at a pharmacy, Henrik Ibsen would often listen to the stories of the Norse maritime pilots. He became a close friend to one of the oldest and most experienced pilots, who had lived a remarkable life and had exciting stories to tell the young writer. His name was Svend Hanssen Haaø, from the island of Haaø (in modern Norwegian Håøya). The story of his life is often thought to be an important source for Ibsen when he wrote his poem Terje Vigen.

Svend Hanssen Haaø's life contains many of the essential elements of the story of Terje Vigen. Haaø made several trips by rowboat to Denmark through the British blockade, in the years 1807-14, to smuggle food back to his family and friends in Grimstad. The British captured him as many as four times, and some of his crew were put in prison in England as in the poem. The poem was a patriotic ode that experienced a resurgence of popularity following Norway’s independence from Sweden in 1905.

Formerly, very reserved about the possibilities of adapting Henrik Ibsen's works to the screen, “Victor Sjostrom did not see how the style of the Norwegian author could be reconciled with the prevailing fashion for comedies and thrillers." Consequently, he did not immediately accede to the wishes expressed by Charles Magnusson (1878-1948), founding director of the Svenska Biograph, who desperately wanted him to film Ibsen's poem. Magnusson had negotiated the rights to the poem from Ibsen’s son Sigurd in 1915.

Later, during a sentimental trip in the region of Varmland, where he spent his childhood, Sjostrom saw his nanny again, who spoke to him about his mother's courage. Continuing his journey by bicycle, the director arrived in Grimstad on the Norwegian coast, where Ibsen first had the idea of writing the poem. The trip was not the catalyst for making the movie, as producer Magnusson already had a script by the fall of 1915, written by newcomer (and future director) Gustaf Molander but Sjöström’s time in the location that inspired Ibsen almost certainly influenced the film’s conception. When he returned to Stockholm in August 1916, he was ready to shoot the film Magnusson dreamed of. In the summer of 1916, Sjöström was scouting locations among the islands of Stockholm’s outer archipelago, the same general area where he had shot The Sea Vultures. The budget was 60,000 Swedish crowns and shooting began in August and lasted three months. The film was budgeted as one of the most expensive Swedish productions to date, three times more than the average feature.

By the standards of its time, A Man There Was was an extremely ambitious film on account of its extensive, incredibly daring seabound sequences. The use of real locations that evoke the majesty and might of nature was an essential component of Sjostrom's art. No visual realization of Ibsen's poem would have worked without stark images of the sea at her most unforgiving. With the camera strapped to boats of various sizes, often venturing out in the most hazardous conditions, Sjostrom's cinematographer Julius Jaenzon manages to give the sea an overwhelming presence in the film, the most powerful manifestation of nature's supremacy over man and its power to guide his destiny. Jaenzon would go on to evoke similar powerful images in 1919's Sir Arne's Treasure.

The film also marks a significant development in Sjostrom's technique, with more dramatic camera setups, faster editing, and less reliance on intertitles to carry the story. For the dramatic sequences in which Terje tries to evade capture by the English, crosscutting is used to build tension and heighten emotion. Later, when Terje is confronted by the man who ruined his life, a short flashback is used which prevents the need for a title card.

The sea plays a leading role alongside the characters. The sea is not only represented as a poetic beauty of nature, but also as a force against which the characters must fight and survive. Vigen's inner feelings are powerfully visualized by cutaway shots to the sea which becomes a mirror of his soul, capable of far greater expression than the human face could show. The subtitles do not describe the plot or dialogue, but only quote excerpts from Henrik Ibsen's poem.

In addition to Kiss of Death (1916), A Man There Was is regarded as an early major work by Victor Sjöström as well as a key work for early Swedish film.

The Swedish Film Institute’s newly color-graded 2006 restoration captures the tinting and toning of the original release, switching in parts from cerulean blue to magenta. The film has a length of 1160 meters and a running time of 59 minutes.

Reception
The film premiered on January 29, 1917 simultaneously in Stockholm, Gothenburg, Malmö, and Copenhagen, with a full program with Ibsen's poems in extenso, posters by the artist Eigil Schwab, and specially composed music. When the film was released, public and critical reception was positive. The film received several good reviews in Sweden.

World War I prevented the film’s release outside Scandinavia until 1919. At that time, 43 copies of the film were exported abroad. Victor Sjöström was presented as the greatest director of his time. It was not until February 1920 that A Man There Was could be seen in the United States. The press raved, with W. Stephen Bush in "The Billboard" calling it, “Truly a masterpiece,” and most everyone agreeing with Burns Mantle in Photoplay: “It is so simple as to story and continuity and cutting and acting that one wonders why some of our output, not nearly so mighty, should use up so much energy and emerge with so much ostentation.” Another journalist wrote: “Seastrom - (his name in English speaking countries) - should come to America to teach his competitors how to make films." The one criticism, nearly universal, was that the intertitles were too dense, leading to the sales agent, L.E. Miller of Radiosoul Films, to place full-page advertisements in the trade publications announcing that the critics’ voices had been heard and the intertitles were being cut down and rewritten. One wonders, though, how much Miller really understood his product given that he placed it as a double feature with Mack Sennett's Down on the Farm, starring Ben Turpin and the dog-and-cat pairing of Teddy & Pepper. To make the evening’s entertainment complete, the Broadway Theatre included a girlie revue called “The Ushers’ Quartet,” featuring four young ladies chosen from the personnel of the various Moss theaters.

René Jeanne and Charles Ford described this masterpiece as "a sort of intimate 'Roland Song' which celebrates the sea and the men who live with it, denounces the cruelty of war and the ambitions of dictators, and which pities all men whom war has taken away from all that they hold dearest in the world and who find themselves alone."

It is said that audience members recited stanzas during the screenings, prompted no doubt by intertitles taken directly from the poem, and spectators of the time felt an additional emotional tug given similar blockades then in force in the North Sea due to World War I.

Terje Vigen is a fundamental milestone in the director's work. “It inaugurates the great period of Sjöström. He has definitely found Ibsen's slow pace, his heavy, solemn gait that envelops the natural world in mysticism.

References

External links

 
 
 

1917 films
1917 drama films
Swedish silent films
Swedish drama films
Swedish black-and-white films
Films based on works by Henrik Ibsen
Films directed by Victor Sjöström
Silent drama films